Important Marine Mammal Areas (IMMAs) were formulated by the joint International Union for Conservation of Nature (IUCN) Species Survival Commission / World Commission on Protected Areas, Marine Mammal Protected Areas Task Force (MMPATF)

Global conservation context

Marine conservation, MPAs and IMMAs 
Marine Conservation is the overarching term that refers to the protection of threatened oceanic species, and usually involves the establishment of marine reserves. Marine conservation is increasingly beginning to make use of protected area models that are based on principles of landscape ecology and ecosystem management.

The most widely used protected area model is Marine protected areas (MPAs), whose purpose is to conserve biodiversity, protect vulnerable ecosystems and enhance marine invertebrate and fish productivity. Marine Protected Areas however, have failed to properly account for Marine Mammals, who have been overlooked in many marine conservation efforts. As a result of this noted shortcoming in the previously existing conservation frameworks, IMMAs were introduced as a separate conservation measure to help rectify this issue.

Criteria for the selection of IMMAs 

The initial criteria for identifying IMMAs were developed at the Workshop for the Development of Important Marine Mammal Area Criteria in Marseille, France, in October 2013. They were further refined in advance of the 3rd International Conference on Marine Mammal Protected Areas in Adelaide, Australia, in November 2014, and through the consultations of a working group following that conference. Finally, a public consultation was held online throughout September–October 2015 on the draft criteria, with the results of the consultation being presented at the Society for Marine Mammalogy Biennial Conference, San Francisco, in December 2015. Consideration in the selection of IMMA criteria was given to the need of IMMAs to be used for the successive identification of Ecologically or Biologically Significant Areas (EBSAs) and Key Biodiversity Areas (KBAs). The criteria for inclusion cover sites that host vulnerable species or a significant percentage of the members of a species, sites that are important for reproduction or feeding, and sites that are home to a wide variety of species.

IMMA Workshops 
From 2016 onwards the major activity of the MMPA Task Force has been to organize a series of regional expert workshops tasked with identifying IMMAs in several of the world’s marine macroregions. The following seven IMMA workshops have been held to date:

 2016 - Mediterranean region
 2017 – Pacific Islands region
 2018 – Extended Southern Ocean region
 2018 – North East Indian Ocean and South East Asian Seas region
 2019 – Western Indian Ocean and Arabian Seas region
 2020 – Australia-New Zealand and South East Indian Ocean region
 2021 – Black Sea, Turkish Straits System and Caspian Sea region

Current IMMAs - 173 Identified Globally 
As of October 2021, 173 IMMAs have been identified following the hosting of seven expert workshops in the regions represented above. There are an additional 23 candidate IMMAs (cIMMAs) and 140 Areas of Interest (AoI). Details of all these are in the online IMMA searchable database  and displayed on the online e-Atlas.

References

External links
IMMA Website

Marine mammals